The Art Collection of John Hunter was a collection of old master and contemporary paintings amassed by John Hunter, an auctioneer and politician, and held by the Hunter family until the death of his only son, Elias Desbrosses Hunter, in 1865. It was auctioned off by the family in January 1866.

History
John Hunter was a Columbia graduate who had taken over his father's auction and commission business at Pearl and Wall Streets in Manhattan. Although Hunter began assembling his collection as early as 1800, it wasn't until he sold the family business in 1810 that his monumental collecting began in earnest. Most of the collection was obtained before 1835 through his agent, Mr. Hobson, and reportedly contained a number of pieces by "Domenichino, Guido Reni, Guercino, Carlo Maratti, Peter Paul Rubens, Anthony van Dyck, Rembrandt, and others."

1866 auction
Following the death of his only son in 1866, his grandson, John Hunter III, decided to sell the family estate, Hunter's Island to former Mayor Ambrose Kingsland $127,501, and auction the collection. The auction by Henry H. Leeds & Miner at their "Dusseldorf Galleries" at 548 Broadway (next door to Tiffany & Co.) consisted of 373 "ancient and modern oil paintings" including a number by masters. At the time of its sale, the "collection was billed as the largest and finest such collection ever exhibited or offered for sale in the United States."

On the first evening there were sold 123 pictures, which yielded $3,433. The second evening there were also brought under the hammer 123 paintings, which went for an aggregate of $6,895, or a total of 246 pictures sold, and $10,328 realized on Wednesday and Thursday nights. On Friday evening there remained to be disposed of 127 pictures... The entire amount of sales last night footed up $18,916.50, making a grand total of all realized for the entire collection of $29,244.50. The highest price paid was for a piece entitled, "The Swing," by Anthony Watteau, which brought $1,250.

At the time, all were considered authentic, but it was later discovered that Hunter's Raphael Madonna and Child with John the Baptist (titled as Madonna and Infant Savior in the catalogue) was actually the work of either Giambettino Cignaroli or his half brother, Giuseppe Cignaroli. It was sold to Hunter as authentic and, thereafter, sold to Bostonian Peter Chardon Brooks. Today, and hangs in the McMullen Museum of Art at Boston College.

Notable works

 Sacking a Village by Philips Wouwerman
 A copy of a Frans van Mieris painting
 Purchasing Fruit by Anonymous
 Pet Bird by François Boucher
 The Tribute Money by John Singleton Copley
 Murder of the Innocents by Peter Paul Rubens
 Singing Party by unknown
 Alexander the Great Elevating Abdalomyne, the gardener, to the Kingdom of Sidon by Jean-Honoré Fragonard
 Alexander the Great after his return from Egypt, visiting the Temple of Jupiter Ammon by Jean-Honoré Fragonard
 Hunting the Boar by Frans Snyders
 Christ in the house of the Pharisee, the woman anointing the feet of the Savior by Paolo Veronese
 Joseph Interpreting the Dreams by Franz Ignaz Oefele
 Monkeys by David Teniers the Younger
 The Music Party by Jan Josef Horemans the Younger
 Ascension of the Virgin by Pietro Berrettini
 Market Scene by Giacomo Da Ponte
 A landscape by Aelbert Cuyp
 Grecian Daughter by Anthoni Schoonjans
 Dead Game, Lobster and Fruit by Jan Weenix
 A Stable Yard by George Morland
 Fox, Dog and Dead Fowl by Paul de Vos

Collection

Paintings

References
Notes

Sources

External links
Catalogue of The late Mr. John Hunter's Extensive Collection of Ancient and Modern Pictures Removed from his Gallery and Residence at Hunter's Island, Westchester Co.: To be Sold at Auction by Henry H. Leeds & Miner at their "Dusseldorf Galleries"

Private art collections
Art collections in the United States